Jack Maylon Simpson (August 20, 1936 – June 3, 1983) was an American collegiate and Professional Football linebacker He played at the University of Mississippi and professionally in the American Football League for the Denver Broncos and the Oakland Raiders.  He was drafted in 1958 by the NFL Washington Redskins, but did not play.  He signed as a free agent with the AFL's Broncos in 1961. He was the defensive coordinator of the Houston Oilers in 1972

Simpson began his pro career in Canada with the Montreal Alouettes, playing 42 games from 1958 to 1961. He was an all-star in 1958 and 1960, and was runner up for the CFL's Most Outstanding Lineman Award in 1958.  Jackie also played briefly with the Calgary Stampeders in 1961, but left to finish the season with Denver. Following his AFL career with Denver and Oakland,  Simpson went back to the CFL in 1965, and played with the Winnipeg Blue Bombers, and completed the season with the Toronto Argonauts.

Jackie served as an AFL scout in 1966, and after the AFL-NFL merger, he was rehired by the San Diego Chargers to work in the personnel department. Sid Gillman found Simpson to be a valuable asset, and hired him as a linebacker coach in 1967.  He remained in that position for 5 years, and then in 1972 was hired as the Houston Oilers defensive coordinator. Jackie left Houston to spend one year (1973)  as linebacker coach with the St. Louis Cardinals.  Simpson was rehired by the San Diego Chargers as defensive coordinator in 1974, and held that position for 7 years. The team was very successful, and made the playoffs in 1979 and 1980, including the January 1981 AFC championship game.  Jackie Simpson coached  for the Seattle Seahawks, serving as defensive coordinator during the 1981-82 seasons. He was beginning his final coaching job,  again as defensive coordinator, with the Detroit Lions, when he suddenly died on June 2, 1983.

Coaching Timeline
 San Diego Chargers (1967-1971) LB
 Houston Oilers (1972) DC
 St. Louis Cardinals (1973) LB
 San Diego Chargers (1974-1980) DC
 Seattle Seahawks (1981-1982) DC
 Detroit Lions (1983) DC through June 2

See also
 Other American Football League players

References

External links
 New York Times obituary

1936 births
1983 deaths
People from Corinth, Mississippi
Players of American football from Mississippi
American football linebackers
Denver Broncos (AFL) players
Oakland Raiders players
Montreal Alouettes players
Ole Miss Rebels football players
San Diego Chargers coaches
Houston Oilers coaches
St. Louis Cardinals (football) coaches
Seattle Seahawks coaches
Detroit Lions coaches
Calgary Stampeders players
Winnipeg Blue Bombers players
Toronto Argonauts players
National Football League defensive coordinators
American Football League players